Peadar John Bradley MLA (28 April 1940 – 1 March 2017) was a Social Democratic and Labour Party (SDLP) politician  who was a Member of the Northern Ireland Assembly (MLA) South Down from 1998 to 2011. He was the SDLP Spokesperson for Agriculture and Rural Development and Deputy Whip of the Assembly's SDLP grouping.

He was elected to Newry and Mourne District Council in 1981. He stepped down from the council in 2005.

His daughter, Sinéad, won his MLA seat in 2016. He died on 1 March 2017.

References

External links
 NI Assembly profile
 SDLP profile

1940 births
2017 deaths
Members of Newry and Mourne District Council
Social Democratic and Labour Party MLAs
Northern Ireland MLAs 1998–2003
Northern Ireland MLAs 2003–2007
Northern Ireland MLAs 2007–2011
People from Warrenpoint
Politicians from County Down